Lashkar  (Army) is a 1989 Bollywood film directed by Jagdish Kadar, starring Dev Anand, Aditya Pancholi, Sonam,  Hemant Birje,  Madhavi, Sumeet Saigal, Jaaved Jaffrey, Kiran Kumar and Sadashiv Amrapurkar. The movie was a huge commission earner at the box office and is believed to be one of the last commercial successes of Dev Anand. This was the only film in the late 1980s that Dev Anand starred in that he did not produce or direct, but acted in the lead role and the film was a major box office success.

Soundtrack

External links

References 

1980s Hindi-language films
1989 films
Films scored by Nadeem–Shravan